The Santiago South Basketball Championships (Portuguese: Campeonato (Regional de) Basquetebol (Basquete) de Santiago Sul)  is a regional basketball championship played in the south of Santiago Island, Cape Verde and is a part of the Santiago South Regional Basketball Association. The winner of the championship plays in Cape Verdean Basketball Championships each season.

For the 2018 season, the championships has been reunited into a single island and is renamed the Santiago Regional Basketball Championships (Campeonato Regional de Basquetebol (Basquete) de Santiago)

Current clubs
ABC - First Division?
Achadinha - First  Division?
ADESBA - First Division?
Desportivo de Assomada
Os Guardiões - First Division?
Lenfer
Palmarejo Bulls
Ponta de Água
Prédio - First Division?
GDR São Lourenço
Seven Stars - First Division?
Unidos do Norte - First Division?

Not in competition
GDRC Delta - First Division?

Former teams
Black Panthers
Lapaloma/Eugénio Lima
Lem Ferreira
CD Travadores - competed until 2004

Winners
Partially listed
2011: Seven Stars
2012: AD Bairro
2015: AD Bairro
2017: Seven Stars

See also
Basketball in Cape Verde

References

External links
Santiago South Regional Basketball Association at League Line-Up
Santiago South Basketball competitions - at Sports Mídia

Basketball in Cape Verde
Sport in Santiago, Cape Verde